Francis Murray Murrell (16 April 1923 – 3 June 2016) was an Australian rules footballer who played with Collingwood in the Victorian Football League (VFL).

Notes

External links 

1923 births
2016 deaths
Australian rules footballers from Victoria (Australia)
Collingwood Football Club players